Breather may refer to:

 Breather - In physics, a breather is a nonlinear wave in which energy concentrates in a localized and oscillatory fashion
 Breather (company) - An Airbnb office space company

Other uses:

 I, the Breather, American metalcore band
 Breather switch, international gap in railway to allow for track expansion
 Breather Resist, American hardcore punk band
 Breather Life, album by American rapper Krazy

Disambiguation pages